North Hopkins High School is a public high school located outside unincorporated Birthright, Texas (USA) and classified as a 2A school by the UIL. It is part of the North Hopkins Independent School District located in north central Hopkins County. The school has a Sulphur Springs, Texas address and is known in the area as Sulphur Springs North Hopkins.  In 2015, the school was rated "Met Standard" by the Texas Education Agency.

Athletics
The North Hopkins Panthers compete in these sports –

Baseball
Basketball
Cross Country
Golf
Softball
Track and Field
Volleyball

State titles
Girls Basketball –
1958(B), 1959(B), 1960(B)
Girls Cross Country –
1993(1A), 2003(1A), 2004(1A)

State finalists
Girls Basketball –
1956(B)

References

External links
North Hopkins ISD

Public high schools in Texas
Public middle schools in Texas